The 1991–92 DFB-Pokal competition came to a close on 23 May 1992 when 1. Bundesliga club Borussia Mönchengladbach played 2. Bundesliga team Hannover 96 at the Olympiastadion in Berlin. Hannover 96 made history as the first, and to date only, club from outside the top division to win the cup when they won 4–3 on penalties. The game had finished goalless after 120 minutes.

Route to the final

Match

Details

References

External links
 Match report at kicker.de 
 Match report at WorldFootball.net
 Match report at Fussballdaten.de 

1992
1991–92 in German football cups
Hannover 96 matches
Borussia Mönchengladbach matches
May 1992 sports events in Europe
1992 in Berlin
Football competitions in Berlin
Association football penalty shoot-outs